Max Porter (born 1981) is an English writer, formerly a bookseller and editor, best known for his debut novel Grief is the Thing with Feathers.

Background 
Porter was born in High Wycombe in 1981 and received a degree in History of Art at the Courtauld Institute of Art in London, followed by an MA in radical performance art, psychoanalysis, and feminism. Prior to his writing career, Porter managed the Chelsea branch of Daunt Books and won the Bookseller of the Year Award in 2009. He was Editorial Director at Granta and Portobello Books until 2019.

In 2019, Porter was named as a guest curator for the Cheltenham Literary Festival.

Works 
Grief is the Thing with Feathers is a hybrid of prose and poetic styles about a crow who visits a grieving family of a Ted Hughes scholar and his two young boys. It draws heavily upon Hughes's Crow: From the Life and Songs of Crow and its title is derived from Emily Dickinson's "Hope is the thing with feathers". In 2016, Grief won the Sunday Times PFD Young Writer of the Year Award, the Books Are My Bag Readers' Award for fiction, and the International Dylan Thomas Prize. It has also been shortlisted for the Guardian First Book Award and the Goldsmiths Prize for experimental writing. Reviewing for The Guardian, Sarah Crown writes that the book "is heartrending, blackly funny, deeply resonant, a perfect summation of what it means to lose someone but still to love the world – and if it reminds publishers that the best books aren’t always the ones that can be pigeonholed or precised or neatly packaged, so much the better". It has been translated into twenty-seven languages.

Grief is the Thing with Feathers was adapted into a play of the same name, directed by Enda Walsh and starring Cillian Murphy, which premiered in Dublin on 25 March 2019 and has been performed in London and New York. In an interview, Porter details the experience of adapting Grief for the stage: "[w]ith both Cillian and Enda, the goal was to make the production as true as it could be to the book. There were no changed endings or swapping one feature for another". Cillian Murphy won an Irish Times Theatre Award for "Best Actor" for his performance as the grieving father. The play was a New York Times Critic's Pick, with Ben Brantley writing that the performance "beautifully evoke[s] the way in which the whole world seems apocalyptic after a personal tragedy".

On 5 March 2019, Porter's second book Lanny was published by Faber and longlisted for the Wainwright Prize 2019 and Man Booker Prize 2019, and has shortlisted for the Gordon Burn Prize 2019. Faber describe Lanny as "a story about a family whose village is peopled by the living and the dead. It’s a story about a boy with a gift for friendship and the traces of enchantment he leaves in the closely woven lives around him". The book examines rural English community life and childhood myth in response to social division and ecological crisis. The book is set to be adapted into a film starring Rachel Weisz.

In 2021, Faber released The Death of Francis Bacon, a hybrid poetic prose work that the publishers describe as "seven extraordinary written pictures the explosive final workings of the artist’s mind". The Death of Francis Bacon is set during the last days of Francis Bacon's life as he lays dying in Madrid and is written in visceral poetic language which corresponds to Bacon's style of painting. Porter describes the text as an "attempt to write as painting, not about it; an attempt to replicate thought, struggle, the struggle of thought, but also the sheer energy of the eye’s confrontation with the painted image" which is "the result of a long preoccupation [...] with Francis Bacon". Writing for the Scotsman, Stuart Kelly claims that the hybrid work is "not a novel, art criticism or biography" but maintains that it is "a very moving depiction of a mind in dissolution at the very edge of death", noting the influence of Dylan Thomas on Porter's "apocalyptic" style of writing.

Porter's publisher Faber and Faber have announced that Porter's next novel Shy - "the polyphonic story of a troubled teenager" - will be published on 6 April 2023 in the UK.

Bibliography

Novels/novellas 
 Grief is the Thing with Feathers (2015)
 Lanny (2019)
The Death of Francis Bacon (2021)
Shy (forthcoming, 2023)

Short stories 
 "Eltham Palace" in Eight Ghosts: The English Heritage Book Of New Ghost Stories (2017, also featuring Kate Clanchy, Stuart Evers, Mark Haddon, Andrew Michael Hurley, Sarah Perry, Kamila Shamsie, and Jeanette Winterson)
"Brother: State of Mind" in Granta Magazine
"The Part-Time Countryman" in Pursuit: The Balvenie Stories Collection edited by Alex Preston (2019)
"Even As We Plunged Down the Hill" in We'll Never Have Paris edited by Andrew Gallix (2019)
RAT (Flash Fiction) in TANK Magazine
"Daughter" in the inaugural edition of INQUE (limited print run, 2021)

Poetry 
 "Kneeling Shepherd (i.m. David Miller)" in The Guardian (2017)
 Jerome's Study, with Catrin Morgan (artist), Prototype publishing (2018)
"Myth of the Mole", with S.J. Fowler, in POETRY (2019)

Non-fiction 
 "Interview with Alice Oswald" in The White Review (2014)
"Dying on the Toilet", an essay on Francis Bacon's painting Triptych May–June 1973 (2016)
"When I Lost My Father, I Lost His Voice Too", personal essay on BuzzFeed (2016)
Studies for Studies (2017, contributor: by artist Catrin Morgan)
Jerome’s Study (2018, with Catrin Morgan)
'Max Porter on Paul McCarthy's 'Piccadilly Circus: Fan Letter', Frieze Issue 200 (2019)
Introduction to Time Lived, Without Its Flow by Denise Riley (Picador, 2019)
"How My Son's Love for Crystal Palace Made Me Fall For Football", autobiographical essay in Mundial
"It Could Be Any Book" in The Gifts of Reading: An Anthology of Essays About the Joys of Reading, Giving and Receiving Books, curated by Jennie Orchard (2020)
"Spirit D'escalier the Size of a Country", for the Aitken Alexander Isolation Series (April 2020)
"It's So Good" (March 2021)
"Poo Fairy" (March 2021)

Miscellaneous 
 "Ground" in Nicola Hicks: Keep Dark (2018)
It's Going To Be A Bright New Day: Would You Rather, with Bonnie Prince Billy (2020, pamphlet)
Lyrics for 'Bed in the River' by Joan Shelley (May 2020)
"MAN" and "WOMAN" lyrics for album DEAD CLUB by Tunng (2020)
Lyrics for EP Three Feral Pieces by Bonnie "Prince" Billy and Nathan Salsburg (April 2021)
All of this Unreal Time (film and art installation, Manchester International Festival, July 2021) Written by Max Porter, featuring Cillian Murphy (actor), directed by Aoife McArdle (director), music by Aaron Dessner, Bryce Dessner, and Jon Hopkins

References 

English novelists
1981 births
Living people
21st-century British novelists
21st-century English male writers